Stephen 'Stevo' George is a former drummer and one of the founding members of the American industrial rock band Ministry. George performed on the band's earliest recordings, including their early singles for the Wax Trax! record label, and their debut album, With Sympathy, released in 1983. He was the drummer for the short-lived pop band Colortone. Since then, George has become a successful producer and mixer, working with many pop artists who have sold gold and platinum records.

Discography 

 Colortone - Colortone (1988)
 Elliot Easton - Change No Change (1985)
 Ministry - With Sympathy (1983)
 Ric Ocasek - Beatitude (1982)

Production work 

 Space Jam Soundtrack (1996) - Engineer, Mixing, Programming
 R. Kelly - R. Kelly (1995) - Engineer, Mixing, Programming

References

External links 
Stephen George at discogs.com

American industrial musicians
Living people
Year of birth missing (living people)
American rock drummers
Ministry (band) members